Psalm 68 is the 68th psalm of the Book of Psalms, or Psalm 67 in Septuagint and Vulgate numbering. In the English of the King James Version it begins "Let God arise, let his enemies be scattered". In the Latin Vulgate version it begins "Exsurgat Deus et dissipentur inimici eius". It has 35 verses (36 according to Hebrew numbering). Methodist writer Arno C. Gaebelein calls it "The Great Redemption Accomplished" and describes it as "one of the greatest Psalms".

Psalm 68 is used in both Jewish and Christian liturgies, and also in that of Ethiopianist new religious movements such as Rastafari. It has often been set to music, such as Marc-Antoine Charpentier's Exurgat Deus (H.215) in Latin around 1690,  for soloists, chorus, two treble instruments and continuo. Handel used verses 11 and 18 in his 1742 oratorio Messiah (HWV 56).

Text

Hebrew / English parallel version 
Following is the Hebrew text of Psalm 68:

King James Version 
Let God arise, let his enemies be scattered: let them also that hate him flee before him.
 As smoke is driven away, so drive them away: as wax melteth before the fire, so let the wicked perish at the presence of God.
 But let the righteous be glad; let them rejoice before God: yea, let them exceedingly rejoice.
 Sing unto God, sing praises to his name: extol him that rideth upon the heavens by his name JAH, and rejoice before him.
 A father of the fatherless, and a judge of the widows, is God in his holy habitation.
 God setteth the solitary in families: he bringeth out those which are bound with chains: but the rebellious dwell in a dry land.
 O God, when thou wentest forth before thy people, when thou didst march through the wilderness; Selah:
 The earth shook, the heavens also dropped at the presence of God: even Sinai itself was moved at the presence of God, the God of Israel.
 Thou, O God, didst send a plentiful rain, whereby thou didst confirm thine inheritance, when it was weary.
 Thy congregation hath dwelt therein: thou, O God, hast prepared of thy goodness for the poor.
 The Lord gave the word: great was the company of those that published it.
 Kings of armies did flee apace: and she that tarried at home divided the spoil.
 Though ye have lien among the pots, yet shall ye be as the wings of a dove covered with silver, and her feathers with yellow gold.
 When the Almighty scattered kings in it, it was white as snow in Salmon.
 The hill of God is as the hill of Bashan; a high hill as the hill of Bashan.
 Why leap ye, ye high hills? this is the hill which God desireth to dwell in; yea, the LORD will dwell in it for ever.
 The chariots of God are twenty thousand, even thousands of angels: the Lord is among them, as in Sinai, in the holy place.
 Thou hast ascended on high, thou hast led captivity captive: thou hast received gifts for men; yea, for the rebellious also, that the LORD God might dwell among them.
 Blessed be the Lord, who daily loadeth us with benefits, even the God of our salvation. Selah.
 He that is our God is the God of salvation; and unto GOD the Lord belong the issues from death.
 But God shall wound the head of his enemies, and the hairy scalp of such an one as goeth on still in his trespasses.
 The Lord said, I will bring again from Bashan, I will bring my people again from the depths of the sea:
 That thy foot may be dipped in the blood of thine enemies, and the tongue of thy dogs in the same.
 They have seen thy goings, O God; even the goings of my God, my King, in the sanctuary.
 The singers went before, the players on instruments followed after; among them were the damsels playing with timbrels.
 Bless ye God in the congregations, even the Lord, from the fountain of Israel.
 There is little Benjamin with their ruler, the princes of Judah and their council, the princes of Zebulun, and the princes of Naphtali.
 Thy God hath commanded thy strength: strengthen, O God, that which thou hast wrought for us.
 Because of thy temple at Jerusalem shall kings bring presents unto thee.
 Rebuke the company of spearmen, the multitude of the bulls, with the calves of the people, till every one submit himself with pieces of silver: scatter thou the people that delight in war.
 Princes shall come out of Egypt; Ethiopia shall soon stretch out her hands unto God.
 Sing unto God, ye kingdoms of the earth; O sing praises unto the Lord; Selah:
 To him that rideth upon the heavens of heavens, which were of old; lo, he doth send out his voice, and that a mighty voice.
 Ascribe ye strength unto God: his excellency is over Israel, and his strength is in the clouds.
 O God, thou art terrible out of thy holy places: the God of Israel is he that giveth strength and power unto his people. Blessed be God.

Name of God
According to Gaebelein, the name of God is found in this psalm in seven different forms: Jehovah (or YHWH), Adonai, El, Shaddai, Jah (or Yah), Jehovah-Adonai and Jah-Elohim.

Uses

In Judaism
According to the "Complete ArtScroll Siddur" as edited by Nosson Scherman in 1984, isolated verses from the psalm are part of contemporary Jewish liturgy:
Verses 5-6 are part of the prayers recited following Motzei Shabbat Maariv (p. 609),
Verse 20 is part of Uva Letzion (p. 157),
Verses 35-36 are the fourth and fifth verses of V'hu Rachum in Pesukei Dezimra (p. 62).

According to "The ArtScroll Tehillim" by Hillel Danziger (1989, p. 329), in some traditions, the entire psalm is recited on Shavuot.

New Testament
Verse 18 of Psalm 68 is referenced in the New Testament in Ephesians 4:8:

 Wherefore he saith, When he ascended up on high, he led captivity captive, and gave gifts unto men.

The passage in the psalm makes reference to the Ark of the Covenant ascending to Mount Zion, and Paul is here
drawing a comparison to the Ascension of Jesus.

Roman Catholic liturgy
In the monastic tradition dating from the Early Middle Ages, this psalm was traditionally recited at the Matins office on Wednesday, according to the distribution of the rule of St. Benedict fixed at 530.

In the current Liturgy of the Hours, Psalm 68 is recited or sung at the Reading Office on Tuesday of the third week in the four weekly cycle. It is also read on the 22nd Sunday of Ordinary Time in year C in the triennial cycle of the Sunday masses.

Eastern Orthodox tradition
Да воскре́снетъ Богъ, и расточа́тся врази́ Его́, и да бѣжа́тъ отъ лица́ Его́ ненави́дящіи Его́. Я́ко исчеза́етъ дымъ, да исче́знутъ; я́ко та́етъ воскъ отъ лица́ огня́, та́ко да поги́бнутъ бѣси отъ лица́ лю́бящихъ Бо́га и зна́менующихся кре́стнымъ зна́меніемъ 
Let God arise, let his enemies be scattered: let them also that hate him flee before him. As smoke is driven away, so let them be driven away: as wax melteth before the fire, so let the wicked perish at the face of those who love God and who are signified by the sign of the cross.

Book of Common Prayer
In the Church of England's Book of Common Prayer, this is the sole psalm appointed to be read on the morning of the 13th day of the month.

Musical settings 
Heinrich Schütz set Psalm 68 in a metred version in German, "Es steh Gott auf, daß seine Feind", SWV 165, as part of the Becker Psalter, first published in 1628.

Marc-Antoine Charpentier composed Exurgat Deus (H.215) around 1690, set for soloists, chorus, 2 treble instruments and continuo.

Philipp Heinrich Erlebach composed Gelobet sei der Herr täglich around 1710, a church cantata for the First Sunday after Trinity beginning with Psalm 68:20.

Handel's 1742 oratorio Messiah (HWV 56) cites verses 1 and 18 according to the King James Version.

Secular references
The second part of verse 31, "Ethiopia shall soon stretch her hands unto God" (Ge'ez: ኢትዮጵያ ታበድ አደዊሃ ሃበ አግዚአብሐር, Itiyopia tabetsih edewiha habe Igziabiher) was used in the coat of arms of Emperor Haile Selassie, and was also formerly used as the national motto of Ethiopia. (The original Hebrew refers to Cush (כוש).)

John Buchan's collection of short stories The Runagates Club (1928) derives its title from verse 6, which in the Book of Common Prayer reads "but letteth the runagates continue in scarceness", where the King James Version has "but the rebellious dwell in a dry land"; runagate is an obsolete spelling of renegade.

References

External links 

 
 
  in Hebrew and English - Mechon-mamre
 Text of Psalm 68 according to the 1928 Psalter
 For the leader. A psalm of David; a song. / May God arise; may his enemies be scattered; / may those who hate him flee before him.a text and footnotes, usccb.org United States Conference of Catholic Bishops
 Psalm 68:1 introduction and text, biblestudytools.com
 Psalm 68 – The Victorious Procession of God to Zion enduringword.com
 Psalm 68 / Refrain: Sing to God, sing praises to his name. Church of England
 Psalm 68 at biblegateway.com

068
Works attributed to David